is a Japanese former professional baseball pitcher in Japan's Nippon Professional Baseball, and belongs to Mainichi Broadcasting System, Inc. as a commentator in baseball live on radio and TV. Ota is a son of an American father and a  Japanese mother, the adopted son of a Japanese stepfather and a Russian stepmother, who emigrated to Japan because of the Russian Revolution in 1917.

High school career
Ota is known for pitching in the final of the 1969 National High School Baseball Championship. He pitched 18 shutout innings on one of the most-watched TV programs in Japanese history. After the game was called due to darkness, he returned the next game, but lost 4-2. Before he graduated from high school, a book had been written about him and several TV documentaries had been aired. A popular figure among women due to his blue eyes and overall appearance, Ota became an instant celebrity nationwide.

Professional career
The first-round pick of the Kintetsu Buffaloes in 1969, Ota went 1-4 with a 3.86 ERA, yet was voted onto the Pacific League All-Star team, starting a dubious trend of being selected to All-Star teams despite mediocre numbers. He was voted an All-Star again in 1971, despite going 0-1 with a 6.84 ERA. He improved to 2-1, 3.90 in 1972, and was an All-Star. In 1973, he went 6-14 with a 3.23 ERA, and was again selected to the All-Star team. 1974 saw him go 10-14, 4.64, which still resulted in him being voted an All-Star. He was 12-12 with a 3.71 ERA in 1975 and was picked once more to the midsummer classic. He led the league in 1975 with six wild pitches, the only time he led the PL in any category.

In 1976 Ota finally missed an All-Star team, going 9-7 with a 3.94 ERA. He returned to the All-Star squad in 1977 and went 10-14 with one save and a 3.21 ERA. He never made another All-Star team and slid downhill to 1-9, 5.40 in 1978, 7-4, 3.31 at age 27, 0-4, 10.66 in 1980, 0-1, 18.00 in 1981 and 0-0, 4.50 in 1982. Overall in Nippon Pro Baseball the high school superstar was 58-85 with 4 saves and a 4.05 ERA.

References

1952 births
Living people
People from Misawa, Aomori
Baseball people from Aomori Prefecture
Japanese people of Russian descent
Japanese baseball players
Nippon Professional Baseball pitchers
Kintetsu Buffaloes players
Yomiuri Giants players
Hanshin Tigers players